Anabasis is a genus of snout moths. It was described by Carl Heinrich in 1956. The genus was long thought to contain only one species, the cassia webworm (Anabasis ochrodesma).

Species
Anabasis flusciflavida Du, Song & Wu, 2005 (southern China)
Anabasis impecuniosa  (Joannis, 1927) (from Mozambique)
Anabasis infusella Meyrick   (southern China)
Anabasis medogia H.H. Li & Y.D. Ren, 2010 (from China)
Anabasis ochrodesma (Zeller, 1881) (from North America)
Anabasis prompta Y.L. Du, S.M. Song & C.S. Wu, 2009 (from China)
Anabasis zhengi L.X. Li & H.H. Li, 2011 (from China)

See also
Anabasii
Anabasis (disambiguation)
Katabasis

References

Phycitinae
Pyralidae genera
Taxa named by Carl Heinrich